A townland (Ulster-Scots: toonlann) is a small geographical division of land, historically and currently used in Ireland and in the Western Isles in Scotland, typically covering  . The townland system is of Gaelic origin, pre-dating the Norman invasion, and most have names of Irish origin. However, some townland names and boundaries come from Norman manors, plantation divisions, or later creations of the Ordnance Survey. The total number of inhabited townlands in Ireland was 60,679 in 1911. The total number recognised by the Irish Place Names database as of 2014 was 61,098, including uninhabited townlands, mainly small islands.

Background

In Ireland a townland is generally the smallest administrative division of land, though a few large townlands are further divided into hundreds. The concept of townlands is based on the Gaelic system of land division, and the first official evidence of the existence of this Gaelic land division system can be found in church records from before the 12th century, it was in the 1600s that they began to be mapped and defined by the English administration for the purpose of confiscating land and apportioning it to  investors or planters from Britain.

Etymology
The term "townland" in English is derived from the Old English word tun, denoting an enclosure. The term describes the smallest unit of land division in Ireland, based on various forms of Gaelic land division, many of which had their own names.

The term baile, anglicised as "bally", is the most dominant element used in Irish townland names. Today the term "bally" denotes an urban settlement, but its precise meaning in ancient Ireland is unclear, as towns had no place in Gaelic social organisation. The modern Irish term for a townland is baile fearainn (plural: bailte fearainn). The term fearann means "land, territory, quarter".

The Normans left no major traces in townland names, but they adapted some of them for their own use, possibly seeing a similarity between the Gaelic baile and the Norman bailey, both of which meant a settlement.

Historical land divisions and etymology

Throughout most of Ulster, townlands were known as "ballyboes" (meaning "cow land"), and represented an area of pastoral economic value. In County Cavan similar units were called "polls", and in Counties Fermanagh and Monaghan they were known as "tates" or "taths". These names appear to be of English origin, but had become naturalised long before 1600. Modern townlands with the prefix tat- are confined almost exclusively to the diocese of Clogher, which covers Counties Fermanagh and Monaghan, and the barony of Clogher in County Tyrone), and cannot be confused with any other Irish word. The use of the term can also be seen in the diocese of Clogher parish of Inniskeen area within Louth where the townlands of Edenagrena, Drumsinnot, Killaconner and Torpass were referred to collectively as “the four tates of Ballyfoylan.” In modern townland names the prefix pol- is widely found throughout western Ireland, its accepted meaning being "hole" or "hollow". In County Cavan, which contains over half of all townlands in Ulster with the prefix pol-, some should probably be better translated as "the poll of ...".

In County Tyrone the following hierarchy of land divisions was used: "ballybetagh" (meaning "cattle place"), "ballyboe", "sessiagh" (meaning sixth part of a quarter), "gort" and "quarter". In County Fermanagh the divisions were "ballybetagh", "quarter" and "tate". Further subdivisions in Fermanagh appear to be related to liquid or grain measures such as "gallons", "pottles" and "pints".

In Ulster the ballybetagh was the territorial unit controlled by an Irish sept, typically containing around 16 townlands. Fragmentation of ballybetaghs resulted in units consisting of four, eight and twelve townlands. One of these fragmented units, the "quarter", representing a quarter of a ballybetagh, was the universal land denomination recorded in the survey of County Donegal conducted in 1608. In the early 17th century 20 per cent of the total area of western Ulster was under the control of the church. These "termonn" lands consisted likewise of ballybetaghs and ballyboes, but were held by erenaghs instead of sept leaders.

Other units of land division used throughout Ireland include:

In County Tipperary, "capell lands" and "quatermeers". A "capell land" consisted of around 20 great acres (one great acre equalled 20 English acres).
In the province of Connacht, "quarters" and "cartrons" (also anglicised as "carrowmeer"), a quarter being reckoned as four cartrons, and each cartron being 30 acres. The quarter has also been anglicised as "carrow", "carhoo" or "caracute".
In County Clare, as in Connacht, "quarters", "half-quarters", "cartrons" and "sessiagh". Here a "half-quarter" equated to around 60 acres, a "cartron" equated to around 30 acres and a "sessiagh" was around 20 acres.

"Cartrons" were also sometimes called "ploughlands" or "seisreagh" (meaning a team of horses yoked to a plough).

Thomas Larcom, the first Director of the Ordnance Survey of Ireland, made a study of the ancient land divisions of Ireland and summarised the traditional hierarchy of land divisions thus:

10 acres – 1 Gneeve; 2 Gneeves – 1 Sessiagh; 3 Sessiaghs – 1 Tate or Ballyboe; 2 Ballyboes – 1 Ploughland, Seisreagh or Carrow; 4 Ploughlands – 1 Ballybetagh, or Townland; 30 Ballybetaghs – Triocha Céad or Barony.

This hierarchy was not applied uniformly across Ireland. For example, a ballybetagh or townland could contain more or less than four ploughlands. Further confusion arises when it is taken into account that, while Larcom used the general term "acres" in his summary, terms such as "great acres", "large acres" and "small acres" were also used in records. Writing in 1846, Larcom remarked that the "large" and "small" acres had no fixed ratio between them, and that there were various other kinds of acre in use in Ireland, including the Irish acre, the English acre, the Cunningham acre, the plantation acre and the statute acre. The Ordnance Survey maps used the statute acre measurement. The quality and situation of the land affected the size of these acres. The Cunningham acre is given as intermediate between the Irish and English acres.

Many of these land division terms have been preserved in the names of modern townlands. For example, the term "cartron" in both its English and Irish forms has been preserved in the townland names of Carrowmeer, Cartron and Carrowvere, while the term "sessiagh" survives in the names Shesia, Sheshodonell, Sheshymore and Shessiv. The terms "ballyboe" and "ballybetagh" tend to be preserved in the truncated form of "bally" as a prefix for some townland names, such as Ballymacarattybeg near Poyntzpass, County Down. Less well-known land division terms may be found in other townland names such as Coogulla ("the Ulster fifth"), Treanmanagh ("the third middle") and Dehomade ("the tenth part").

A problem with the term "bally" in some townland names is that it can be difficult to distinguish between the Irish terms baile meaning "townland" and béal átha meaning "approach to a ford". An example of the latter is Ballyshannon, County Donegal, which is derived from Béal Átha Seanaidh.

Size and value
In fact, the townland of Clonskeagh in the barony of Uppercross (abutting the main Clonskeagh townland in the barony of Dublin) was only  although the area is now urbanised, so that the townlands are unused and their boundaries are uncertain.

The ballyboe, a townland unit used in Ulster, was described in 1608 as containing 60 acres of arable land, meadow, and pasture. However, this was misleading, as the size of townlands under the Gaelic system varied depending upon their quality, situation and economic potential. This economic potential varied from the extent of land required to graze cattle to the land required to support several families. The highest density of townland units recorded in Ulster in 1609 corresponds to the areas with the highest land valuations in the 1860s.

It seems that many moorland areas were not divided into townlands until fairly recently. These areas were "formerly shared as a common summer pasturage by the people of a whole parish or barony".

Historical use
Until the 19th century most townlands were owned by single landlords and occupied by multiple tenants. The cess, used to fund roadworks and other local expenses, was charged at the same rate on each townland in a barony, regardless of its size and productive capacity. Thus, occupiers in a small or poor townland suffered in comparison to those of larger or more fertile townlands. This was reformed by Griffith's Valuation.

Irish Ordnance Survey and standardisation
During the 19th century an extensive series of maps of Ireland was created by the Irish division of the Ordnance Survey for taxation purposes. These maps both documented and standardised the boundaries of the more than 60,000 townlands in Ireland. The process often involved dividing or amalgamating existing townlands, and defining townland boundaries in areas such as mountain or bog that had previously been outside the townland system. Slight adjustments are still made. There were 60,679 in 1911, compared to 60,462 townlands in 1901.

Current use
 Townlands form the building blocks for higher-level administrative units such as parishes and district electoral divisions (in the Republic of Ireland) or wards (in Northern Ireland).

Before 1972 townlands were included on all rural postal addresses throughout the island, but in that year the Royal Mail decided that the townland element of the address was obsolete in Northern Ireland. Townland names were not banned, but they were deemed "superfluous information" and people were asked not to include them on addresses. They were to be replaced by house numbers, road names and postcodes. In response the Townlands Campaign emerged to protest against the changes. It was described as a "ground-level community effort". Taking place in the midst of The Troubles, the campaign was a rare example of unity between Catholics and Protestants, nationalists and unionists. Townlands and their names "seem to have been considered as a shared resource and heritage". Those involved in the campaign argued that, in many areas, people still strongly identified with their townlands and that this gave them a sense of belonging. The Royal Mail's changes were seen as a severing of this link.

At the time the county councils were the government bodies responsible for validating the change. However, as local government itself was undergoing changes, the Royal Mail's decision was "allowed ... to become law almost by default". County Fermanagh is the only county in Northern Ireland that managed to resist the change completely. Nevertheless, many newer road signs in parts of Northern Ireland now show townland names (see picture). In 2001 the Northern Ireland Assembly passed a motion requesting government departments to make use of townland addresses in correspondence and publications.

In the Republic of Ireland townlands continue to be used on addresses. In 2005 the Department of Communications, Energy and Natural Resources announced that a postcode system was to be introduced (see Republic of Ireland postal addresses). The system, known as Eircode, was introduced in 2014, but although more widely used by 2021, townlands remain predominant address identifiers in rural areas.

See also
Lists of townlands in Ireland by county

Footnotes

Sources

References

Further reading

External links

All island
GeoHive Mapviewer: select Data Catalogue>Base Information and Mapping>Historic Map [25 inch (1888-1913) / 6 inch (1837-1842)] for old Ordnance Survey of Ireland maps 
Logainm.ie (Placenames Database of Ireland) search/browse by parish/barony/county, English and Irish names

IreAtlas townland database (John Broderick) searchable database derived from the Index to the 1851 Census
Townland indexes to pre-1921 censuses, digitised from command papers: 1861 index (to 1841/1851 censuses); 1871 index, 1881 supplement, 1891 supplement 1901 index, 1911 supplement
1911 Census details (National Archives of Ireland) Arranged by County>DED>Townland>Household
Townland data from OpenStreetMap Townlands, Baronies and Civil Parishes are being added to OpenStreetMap, making them available as a modern geo format. This is a list of the townlands mapped in OpenStreetMap

Republic
GeoHive Mapviewer: select Data Catalogue>Population and Economy>Townlands
Categories of Disadvantaged Areas Department of Agriculture, Food and the Marine Excel spreadsheet (per county) giving area in hectares, electoral division, and agricultural category of each townland

Northern Ireland
Northern Ireland Place-Name Project Searchable using both maps and lists, with information about placename origins
Ordnance Survey of Northern Ireland:
Mapviewer (includes layers with current and historical townland borders and names)
Townland indexes to censuses: 1926 index; 1937 supplement

By county
Parishes of County Mayo (Mayo County Library) list of townlands by parish, with maps and other data
Index of Townlands of County Kildare (Kildare Council Library's local studies department) IreAtlas data updated to 1911

 
 
 
Types of administrative division